This is a list of notable dedicated footwear designers.

See also
 List of fashion designers

 
Fashion occupations
Lists of people by occupation
Fashion-related lists